Jasper station is on the Canadian National Railway mainline in Jasper, Alberta.  The station is served by Via Rail's The Canadian and is the eastern terminus for the Via Rail's Jasper – Prince Rupert train.  The Rocky Mountaineer company trains such as the Journey through the Clouds use the station as a terminus, these trains continue to Quesnel railway station.

History 

Jasper was created as a railway siding in 1911 by the Grand Trunk Pacific Railway.  It was originally called Fitzhugh, part of the Grand Trunk Pacific's alphabet line, but was renamed in 1913 when the townsite was surveyed.  By 1913 both the Grand Trunk and the Canadian Northern Railway called on Jasper.  By 1923 the CNoR and the GTPR were taken oven by the Canadian government and merged into the Canadian National Railway, which continued to use the old GTPR station until it burned down during the winter of 1924–25.

The current station was constructed by the CNR in 1926.  The station was declared a heritage railway station by the federal government in 1992.

See also

 List of designated heritage railway stations of Canada

References

External links 

Via Rail Station Description
Travel Guide to Jasper Station

Via Rail stations in Alberta
Designated Heritage Railway Stations in Alberta
Jasper, Alberta
Railway stations in Canada opened in 1926
Canadian National Railway stations in Alberta
Rocky Mountaineer stations in Alberta
1926 establishments in Alberta